Jankov Most is a village in Serbia. It is located in the Zrenjanin municipality, in the Central Banat District, in the province of Vojvodina. The village has a Romanian ethnic majority (60.37%) and its population numbered 636 in the 2002 census.

History

The first time mentioned as Iancahid in 1221. This name translates from Hungarian to Serbian as Jankov Most. Banatian historic Feliks Mileker from Vršac wrote that Dezideriu, bishop of Cenada, left Itebejs Parish and he traveled throughout Iancahid. Jankov Most is one of the oldest settlements in Zrenjanin municipal. In written sources from 14th century, it was known as "Passin Jankait". In 1660., it was mentioned that 3 settlements of Romanians and Orthodox Serbs are in this area: Jancait, Multvelin i Pessin Jancait. Later, in 18th century, the village is called "Nagy Jankahid" (Big Jankov Most) and "Kiss Jankahid" (Small Jankov Most). In 1747. the village was colonized by Romanians from Máramaros County. They came from village Bešenova, and one of proofs of this is that most of inhabitants in Iancahid have surname Besu. The village was property of many landlords through the last centuries. In the year 1781. village and pasture near was bought by count Lazar Lukač, who bought village Ečka also. 1838. village becomes property of Lazar Žigmond, and after that count Hernonkur.

Historical population

1961: 1,057
1971: 977
1981: 841
1991: 752
2002: 636
2011: 530

References
Slobodan Ćurčić, Broj stanovnika Vojvodine, Novi Sad, 1996.

See also
List of places in Serbia
List of cities, towns and villages in Vojvodina

Populated places in Serbian Banat
Zrenjanin
Romanian communities in Serbia